Gottfried Bammes (26 April 1920 – 14 May 2007) was a professor of art at the Dresden Academy of Fine Arts, Germany. His anatomic drawing textbooks have become standard reference works; several have been translated into English.

Partial bibliography
Die Gestalt des Menschen
Die neue große Zeichenschule
Menschen zeichnen
Der nackte Mensch
Figürliches Gestalten
Tiere zeichnen
Künstleranatomie und bildnerischer Ausdruck
Körper und Gewand
Studien zur Gestalt des Menschen
Wir zeichnen den Menschen - 1989
Landschaften (Ein Ausdruck zu bildnerischem und künstlerischem Ausdruck)

Awards
 National Prize of East Germany for science and technology (1974)
 Culture and Art Award of the city of Freital (2000)
 Honorary citizenship of Freital (2004)

References 

 Biography of Gottfried Bammes on the website of the city of Freital

External links 
 

German artists
Recipients of the National Prize of East Germany
1920 births
2007 deaths
German art educators